is a Japanese former footballer.

Career statistics

Club

Notes

References

1991 births
Living people
Association football people from Hyōgo Prefecture
Osaka Sangyo University alumni
Japanese footballers
Japanese expatriate footballers
Association football defenders
Singapore Premier League players
Albirex Niigata Singapore FC players
Japanese expatriate sportspeople in Singapore
Expatriate footballers in Singapore